Blyton is an unincorporated community in Fulton County, Illinois, United States. The community is located on Illinois Route 9, west of Canton.

References

Unincorporated communities in Fulton County, Illinois
Unincorporated communities in Illinois